Mass fraction may refer to:
Mass fraction (chemistry), it is the ratio of mass of a constituent to the total mass of the mixture
Fuel mass fraction
Propellant mass fraction (aerospace), the amount of mass left behind such as the stages of rockets
Payload fraction (aerospace), the ratio of the mass to be transported compared to the total mass of the vehicle, including fuel